The NBC superhero serial drama series Heroes follows the lives of people across the globe who possess various superhuman powers as they struggle to cope with their everyday lives and prevent foreseen disasters from occurring. The series premiered on American and Canadian television on September 25, 2006. The first season, which finished 21st of 142 American primetime television programs in Nielsen ratings, was released on DVD and HD DVD on August 28, 2007. The Blu-ray was released on August 26, 2008. Within the seasons of the show are "volumes", which allow the writers to focus on shorter story arcs. The first season comprises a single volume of 23 episodes called Genesis, which is also the same title of the show's pilot episode.

Plot
The plot of Heroes is designed to be similar to the stories of comic books with small story arcs built into the series' larger story arc plot. Each season of Heroes is designed to involve ordinary people who discover extraordinary super powers, and how these abilities take effect in the character's daily lives.

The first season, known as "Genesis", begins as a seemingly ordinary group of people gradually becomes aware that they have special abilities. Events illustrate their reactions to these powers, and how the discovery affects their personal and professional lives. At the same time, several ordinary individuals are investigating the origins and extent of these abilities. Mohinder continues his late father's research into the biological source of the change, while Noah represents a secret organization known only as "The Company". While coping with these new abilities, each of the characters is drawn, willingly or unwillingly, into the Company's conspiracy to control superpowered people and into a race to stop an explosion from destroying New York City. Meanwhile, focus is placed on Peter Petrelli as he tries to maintain his volatile power, and Sylar, a serial killer hunting superhumans.

Cast and characters
Milo Ventimiglia as Peter Petrelli, the protagonist; a nurse and Nathan's brother, gains the abilities of evolved humans who come near him.
Hayden Panettiere as Claire Bennet, a high school cheerleader with the power of rapid cellular regeneration. Marc Hirschfeld, executive vice president of casting for NBC Universal Television stated, "When they were trying to decide who the cheerleader should be, I literally picked up the phone and said to the producers, 'You've got to meet Hayden Panettiere.'"
Jack Coleman as Noah Bennet, or "Horn-Rimmed Glasses" (recurring episodes 1 to 10), Claire's father and employee of the Company.
Tawny Cypress as Simone Deveaux, Peter's friend and Isaac's girlfriend.
Leonard Roberts as D. L. Hawkins, a convict who can walk through solid objects.
Santiago Cabrera as Isaac Mendez, a painter and drug addict with the ability to paint the future.
Masi Oka as Hiro Nakamura, an office worker who possesses the ability of space-time manipulation. This allows him to teleport, stop time, or travel through time, but recent events in the series have prevented him from regaining his full abilities. Hiro was one of the last main characters to be created by Tim Kring; he was added to the pilot episode after Kring's wife noticed none of the existing main characters were happy about their powers.
Greg Grunberg as Matt Parkman is a police officer with the power to read minds.
Adrian Pasdar as Nathan Petrelli, an anti-hero and New York senator who can fly.
Noah Gray-Cabey as Micah Sanders, Niki and D.L.'s son and a technopath.

 Ali Larter as Niki Sanders, D.L. Hawkins' wife and Micah Sanders' mother. She is a single mother with a dangerous alter-ego and super-strength. 
 Larter also plays Jessica Sanders, Niki's split personality.

Sendhil Ramamurthy as Mohinder Suresh, a scientist who continues his father's research on super-powered humans.

Recurring characters

Episodes

Production

Conception
Heroes began development early in 2006, when Tim Kring, creator of NBC's Crossing Jordan, came up with the show's concept. Kring wanted to create a "large ensemble saga" that would connect with the audience. He began thinking about how big, scary and complicated he felt the world is, and wanted to create a character-driven series about people who could do something about it. Kring felt that a cop or medical drama did not have characters that were big enough to save the world. He came up with the thought of superheroes; ordinary people who would discover extraordinary abilities, while still rooted in the real world and in reality. Casting directors Jason La Padura and Natalie Hart brought forth a cast of new faces such as Milo Ventimiglia who described the pilot as a "character drama about everyday people with a heightened reality." A heightened reality that was brought to light through the work of production designer Ruth Ammon. Kring wanted the series to have touchstones that involved the characters and the world they lived in.

Before he began putting his ideas together, he spoke with Lost executive producer Damon Lindelof, with whom he had worked for three years on Crossing Jordan. Kring credits Lindelof for giving him ideas on how to pitch the series to the network and advice on the lessons he (Lindelof) learned about working on a serialized drama. The two still speak and support each other's projects. When Kring pitched the idea for Heroes to the NBC network, he described the network's reaction as "excited...very supportive." He comments that he has been partners with NBC for some time based on his six-year run as showrunner for Crossing Jordan. When he pitched the pilot, he described every detail, including the cliffhanger ending. When NBC executives asked him what was going to happen next, Kring responded, "Well, you'll just have to wait and find out." After the project was greenlit, a special 73-minute version of the pilot was first screened to a large audience at the 2006 Comic Con in San Diego. It was initially reported that this unaired pilot would not be released, however it was included on the first season DVD set.

Reception

Critical reception
During the series' first season, the American Film Institute named Heroes one of the ten "best television programs of the year."
Doug Elfman of the Chicago Sun-Times stated, "the show's super strengths are its well-developed filmmaking, smooth pacing and a perfect cast. It views like the first hour of a fun, thoughtful movie." Barry Garron at The Hollywood Reporter also stated, "Heroes is one of TV's most imaginative creations and might, with luck, become this year's Lost." Less favorable reviews included the Philadelphia Inquirer, who commented that although the show had many "cool effects," it "lands, splat, in a pile of nonsense and dim dialogue." In response to the first pod of season one episodes, The Chicago Tribune went as far as saying, "you could watch the first few episodes of Heroes, or you could repeatedly hit yourself on the head with a brick. The effect is surprisingly similar." 

On Rotten Tomatoes, the first season received an 83% approval rating, with average rating of 8.04/10, based on 18 reviews. The website's consensus reads, "The first season of Heroes promises a fresh take on the superhero genre, with enough style and foreshadowed intrigue to attract a following." At Metacritic, the Heroes pilot received a 67/100, with generally favorable reviews from critics.

Ratings

The pilot episode generated 14.3 million viewers, with the season high topping out at 16.03 million viewers for episode 9. When the series returned from hiatus on January 22, 2007, the ratings averaged about the same as the pilot with 14.9 million viewers. When the show went on a second hiatus during the first season, from March 4, 2007 to April 23, 2007 (7 weeks), ratings hit a new low; the lowest being 11.14 million viewers during part one of the three part finale, "The Hard Part."

Awards and nominations
By the time Heroes completed the first half of the first season, the show had already collected an assortment of honors and accolades. On December 13, 2006, the Writers Guild of America nominated the program for "best new series" of 2007. On December 14, the Hollywood Foreign Press Association nominated the program for a Golden Globe Award for "best television drama", and nominated Masi Oka (Hiro Nakamura) for Best Supporting Actor on a TV Series. On January 9, 2007, Heroes won the award for Favorite New TV Drama at the 33rd People's Choice Awards. The National Association for the Advancement of Colored People nominated Heroes on January 9, 2007 for an Image Award in the "Outstanding Drama Series" category. On February 21, 2007, it was announced that Heroes was nominated for five Saturn Awards. The nominations included "Best Network Television Series", "Best Supporting Actor in a Television Series" for both Greg Grunberg and Masi Oka, and "Best Supporting Actress in a Television Series" for Hayden Panettiere and Ali Larter. On February 22, 2008, it was announced that Heroes was again nominated for five Saturn Awards. In 2008 it was nominated for "Best Television Series on DVD."

On July 19, 2007, the Academy of Television Arts & Sciences announced their nominations for the 2007 Primetime Emmy awards. Heroes was nominated in eight categories, including Outstanding Drama Series. The first episode, "Genesis", earned six nominations: Outstanding Directing (David Semel), Outstanding Art Direction for a Single-Camera Series, Outstanding Single-Camera Picture Editing for a Drama Series, Outstanding Sound Mixing for a Comedy or Drama Series, and Outstanding Stunt Coordination. The episode "Five Years Gone" also received a nomination for Outstanding Visual Effects for a Series. Masi Oka was nominated for Outstanding Supporting Actor in a Drama Series. On September 16, 2007, the 59th Primetime Emmy Awards were held and Heroes failed to win a single Emmy award despite the eight nominations. On July 21, 2007, the Television Critics Association awarded Heroes with the prestigious Outstanding Program of the Year title during their 23rd Annual TCA Awards ceremony. The cast of Heroes was named in the 2006 Time Magazine's Person of the Year issue under "People Who Mattered".

DVDs
The first DVD release of Heroes was a sampler disc, containing only the first episode, and was released in Ireland and the UK on September 3, 2007. UK Region 2 split Heroes into two halves on its initial release; part one being released on October 1, 2007 and part two on December 10, 2007. When the second part was released, a complete first season boxset was also released on the same day on both DVD and HD DVD formats The complete first season DVD includes nearly 3 hours of bonus features including: an extended 73-minute version of the pilot episode with audio commentary; 50 deleted and extended scenes; behind the scenes featurettes, including the making of Heroes, stunts, a profile of artist Tim Sale, and the score; and audio commentaries with cast, crew and show creator Tim Kring. On February 22, 2008, the Heroes Season One DVD was nominated for a 2008 Saturn Award, in the category of "Best Television Series on DVD." The complete first season was released in USA and Canada on August 28, 2007. It was released in Australia and New Zealand on September 17, 2007.

Universal Studios Home Entertainment has announced that the first and second seasons would be released on Blu-ray on August 26, 2008, the same date as the DVD release of the second season.

Notes

References

01
2006 American television seasons
2007 American television seasons